Environmental Politics is a peer-reviewed academic journal, published seven times per year, which provides a forum for environmental politics particularly in relation to environmental social movements, NGOs, and parties; analysis of environmental policy-making; and environmental political thought. The journal publishes articles on politics at all scales (local, national, and global) and studies from all regions of the world. The journal's editor-in-chief is John M. Meyer (Humboldt State University).

Abstracting and indexing 

According to the Journal Citation Reports, the journal has a 2019 impact factor of 4.320, ranking it 3rd out of 180 journals in the category "Political Science" and 21st out of 123 journals in the category "Environmental Studies".

See also 
 List of environmental social science journals
 List of political science journals

References

External links 
 

Bimonthly journals
English-language journals
Environmental health journals
Political science journals
Publications established in 1992
Taylor & Francis academic journals